Damnation is a 1988 black-and-white Hungarian film directed by Béla Tarr. The screenplay was co-written by Tarr and his frequent collaborator, László Krasznahorkai.

The movie has been compared to the works of Andrei Tarkovsky and Michelangelo Antonioni.

Plot
Damnation tells the story of Karrer (Miklós B. Székely), a depressed man in love with a married torch singer (Vali Kerekes) from a local bar, the Titanik. The singer breaks off their affair, because she dreams of becoming famous. Karrer is offered smuggling work by Willarsky (Gyula Pauer), a local bartender. Karrer offers the job to the singer's husband, Sebestyén (György Cserhalmi). This gets him out of the way, but things do not go as Karrer plans. Betrayals follow. Karrer despairs.

Reception
Damnation is generally acclaimed by film critics, and many rank it one of Tarr's finest works. Review aggregator Rotten Tomatoes reports a 92% approval rating based on 12 reviews. Michael Atkinson of Village Voice called the film "a serotonin-depleted ordeal, and yet seemingly a sketchbook of vibes and ideas to come, with some of the most magnificent black-and-white images shot anywhere in the world." Jonathan Rosenbaum wrote in the Chicago Reader, "The near miracle is that something so compulsively watchable can be made out of a setting and society that seem so depressive and petrified." Writing for Slant Magazine, Jeremiah Kipp argued, "In terms of creating a strong cinematic world, Tarr has few equals."

References

External links
 
 
 
Jonathan Rosenbaum review

Hungarian black-and-white films
Films directed by Béla Tarr
1980s Hungarian-language films
1988 drama films
1988 films
Films with screenplays by László Krasznahorkai